Jason Raymond Alexander (born March 1, 1993) is an American professional baseball pitcher for the Milwaukee Brewers of Major League Baseball (MLB).

Amateur career 
Alexander went to high school at Cardinal Newman High School, in Santa Rosa, California, and attended college at California State University, Long Beach and Menlo College.

Professional career

Los Angeles Angels
Alexander signed with the Los Angeles Angels as an undrafted free agent on June 19, 2017. He finished his first pro campaign having appeared in 18 games split between the Orem Owlz, Arizona League Angels, and High-A Inland Empire 66ers. He pitched to a cumulative 2–1 record and 3.50 ERA with 37 strikeouts in 43.2 innings of work. In 2018, Alexander split the year between Inland Empire, the Double-A Mobile BayBears, and Triple-A Salt Lake Bees. In 24 total games (21 starts), he pitched to a 4–10 record and 4.41 ERA with 95 strikeouts in 116.1 innings of work.

In 2019, he played with Mobile and Salt Lake, accumulating a 4–8 record and 6.66 ERA with 96 strikeouts in 101.1 innings pitched spanning 23 games (15 starts). Alexander did not play in a game in 2020 due to the cancellation of the minor league season because of the COVID-19 pandemic. On June 5, 2020, Alexander was released by the Angels.

Miami Marlins
On April 21, 2021, Alexander signed a minor league contract with the Miami Marlins. He spent the majority of his season with Triple-A Jacksonville Jumbo Shrimp. With scoreless appearances in a game apiece for the Florida Complex League Marlins and Double-A Pensacola Blue Wahoos, Alexander pitched to a 1.84 ERA with 18 strikeouts in 5 games (4 starts) for Jacksonville. He elected free agency following the season on November 7.

Milwaukee Brewers
On November 19, 2021, Alexander signed a minor league contract with the Milwaukee Brewers organization. He was assigned to the Triple-A Nashville Sounds to begin the 2022 season. 

Alexander was promoted to the Major Leagues on June 1, and made his debut later that day. In 2022 in Triple-A he was 8–2 with a 2.84 ERA in 63.1 innings.

On February 18, 2023, Alexander was placed on the 60-day injured list with a strained right rotator cuff.

Personal life 
Alexander's older brother, Scott, is a pitcher in the San Francisco Giants organization and previously pitched for the Kansas City Royals and the Los Angeles Dodgers.

References

External links

1993 births
Living people
People from Windsor, California
Baseball players from California
Major League Baseball pitchers
Milwaukee Brewers players
Menlo Oaks baseball players
Long Beach State Dirtbags baseball players
Arizona League Angels players
Orem Owlz players
Inland Empire 66ers of San Bernardino players
Mobile BayBears players
Salt Lake Bees players
Florida Complex League Marlins players
Pensacola Blue Wahoos players
Jacksonville Jumbo Shrimp players
Nashville Sounds players